The Haymarket Martyrs' Monument is a funeral monument and sculpture located at Forest Home Cemetery in Forest Park, Illinois, a suburb of Chicago. Dedicated in 1893, it commemorates the defendants involved in labor unrest who were blamed, convicted, and executed for the still unsolved bombing during to the Haymarket Affair (1886).  The monument's bronze sculptural elements are by artist Albert Weinert. On February 18, 1997, the monument was designated a National Historic Landmark.

History
Following the Haymarket affair, trial and executions, August Spies, Adolph Fischer, George Engel, Louis Lingg, and Albert Parsons were buried at the German Waldheim Cemetery (later merged with Forest Home Cemetery).

The Pioneer Aid and Support Association organized a subscription for a funeral monument. In 1893, the Haymarket Martyrs' Monument by sculptor Albert Weinert was raised at Waldheim. It consists of a 16-foot-high granite shaft capped by a carved triangular stone.  There is a two step base, which also supports a pedestal and a monumental figure of Justice, depicted as a woman standing guard over the body of a fallen worker, both in bronze. In one hand, she holds a laurel wreath to crown the fallen. Resting on the top of the second step is an arrangement in bronze of palm leaves. The inscription on the pedestal reads, "1887", the year of the executions. Also, there is a quote on the first step attributed to Spies, recorded just before his execution by hanging: "The day will come when our silence will be more powerful than the voices you are throttling today."

On the back of the monument are listed the names of the men.  Above the names, a bronze plaque contains text of the pardon later issued by Governor John Peter Altgeld of Illinois.

The monument was dedicated on June 25, 1893, after a march from Chicago. The dedication ceremony was attended by 8,000, with trade union flags and the American flag draped on the monument.  European unions and American organizations sent flowers to be placed.  A number of activists and labor leaders were subsequently buried nearby. Haymarket defendants, Michael Schwab and Oscar Neebe were also buried at monument when they died. Samuel Fielden is the only Haymarket defendant who is not buried at Forest Home. For years, annual commemorations were held.

Since the 1970s, the Illinois Labor History Society has held the deed to the monument and been responsible for its maintenance and restoration. It conducts monthly guided tours of Forest Home Cemetery from May through October.

Time capsule
In October 2016, volunteers and scientists dug near the base of the monument where they recovered an urn while searching for a lost time capsule that had been buried under the cornerstone on November 6, 1892, during the monument's construction. According to a list in the records of the Pioneer Aid and Support Association, the lost time capsule is to contain newspaper articles, letters to and from the Haymarket defendants, and photographs of the men and their families. It also held trial documents, essays, and letters and testimonials from a number of labor unions and fraternal organizations. In addition, it may contain a bust of August Spies. Research is ongoing to determine the location of the time capsule.

The group that discovered the urn cylinder also found a smaller concrete cube thought to be a cremation vault for the ashes of Haymarket martyr Oscar Neebe, pardoned by Gov. John Altgeld, who died in 1916.

Gallery

See also
Monuments relating to the Haymarket affair
List of National Historic Landmarks in Illinois

References

External links

Haymarket Martyrs Monument, wikimapia
"Haymarket Memorial", wikimapia
http://chicago-outdoor-sculptures.blogspot.com/2009/03/haymarket-memorial.html

National Register of Historic Places in Cook County, Illinois
National Historic Landmarks in Illinois
Works about the Haymarket affair
History of Chicago
Labor monuments and memorials
Monuments and memorials on the National Register of Historic Places in Illinois
Sculptures of women in Illinois
Cemetery art